Chadalavada Sundararamasastri (1865–1925) was Telugu Pundit and owner of Telugu Publishing house, Saradamba Vilasa Mudraksharashala. He also authored multiple books and wrote commentaries to many Sanskrit texts in Telugu. He was also awarded a gold bracelet (swarna kankanam) from the Prince of Wales in 1922 for his contribution to Telugu literature.

He was also associated with the famous Vavilla Ramaswamy Sastrulu and Sons publishing house and a close relative of its founder Vavilla Ramaswamy Sastrulu.

List of books written
 Dakshinamurthi Stotra.
 Saswara Andhra Rudhradhyayamu.
 Vedantha Dindhimamu.
 Aparoskhanubhuti.
 Gowthama Smrithi.
 Manudharma Sastram.
 Ambagitham.
 Sri Rama Hridayamu.
 Sri Ramayana Sara Sangrahamu.
 Aditya Hridayamu.
 Dharma Sindhuvu.
 Adi Virata Parvamulu (Tika) in co-operation with Dandigunta Suryanarayana Sastri.
 Vasista Ramayanamu (Prose).
 Jagannadha Satakamu.
 Abhidana Ratnamala.

References

 Chapter 7 in Vavilla Ramaswamy Sastri, a book by V.V.Subrahmanya Sarma, published by C.P. Brown Academy, 2009.
He was the eldest son in law of Sri Vavilla Rama Sastri, and he selflessly  looked after his printing press after his father in law's demise until his brother in law Sri Vavilla Venkateswara sastri, came of age, and silently after handing over the press, remained with full detachment.
He was the Raja-guru (philosophical & spiritual guide) to the Raja's of venkatagiri.

Telugu writers
Writers from Andhra Pradesh
1865 births
1925 deaths
Indian publishers (people)
19th-century Indian businesspeople
20th-century Indian businesspeople
Businesspeople from Andhra Pradesh